Louis Breithaupt may refer to:

 Louis Jacob Breithaupt (1855–1939), manufacturer and politician in Ontario, Canada
 Louis Orville Breithaupt (1890–1960), politician and Lieutenant Governor of Ontario 
 Louis Breithaupt (tanner) (1827–1880), German-born tanner and politician in Ontario, Canada